Trigonobalanus is a genus of three species of evergreen trees in the family Fagaceae, related to oaks, beeches and chestnuts. The species are widely scattered, with one in northern South America and two in southeast Asia; some botanists treat the three species in separate genera. The three species, with their authors, major synonyms, and distribution, are:

Trigonobalanus doichangensis (A.Camus) Forman (syn. Formanodendron doichangensis (A.Camus) Nixon & Crepet) - subtropical Yunnan to northern Thailand
Trigonobalanus excelsa Lozano, Hern. Cam. & Henao (syn. Colombobalanus excelsa (Lozano, Hern. Cam. & Henao) Nixon & Crepet) - endemic to Colombia
Trigonobalanus verticillata Forman - tropical Indonesia and the Malay Peninsula

External links

WCSP: Trigonobalanus
Thai BFK Forest Herbarium: Trigonobalanus doichangensis (description and photos)
Flora of China: Formanodendron doichangensis (with drawing)
Drawing of Trigonobalanus verticillata
Photo of Colombobalanus excelsa

Fagaceae
Fagales genera